Zalivnoy is a rural locality (a settlement) in Savinskoye Rural Settlement, Pallasovsky District, Volgograd Oblast, Russia. The population was 155 as of 2010. There are 7 streets.

Geography 
Zalivnoy is located on the right bank of the Torgun River, 17 km east of Pallasovka (the district's administrative centre) by road. Limanny is the nearest rural locality.

References 

Rural localities in Pallasovsky District